Juliet Morris (born  1965) is a British television presenter.

Juliet Morris may also refer to:

 Juliet Morris, an American child actor who appeared on the 2018-19 TV show Kidding